Ron Kaplan (רון קפלן; born May 1, 1970) is an Israeli former Olympic gymnast.

A four-time national champion, he won a gold medal for Israel in the 1989 Maccabiah Games. He also competed for Israel in two European Men's Artistic Gymnastics Championships, as well as four World Artistic Gymnastics Championships, and represented Israel at the 1992 Summer Olympics.

Early life
Kaplan was born in Beer Sheva, Israel, and is Jewish. He attended UCLA, and competed as a gymnast for the Bruins. He served in the Israel Defense Forces.

Israeli champion
Kaplan was the Israeli individual all-around gymnastics champion from 1989–92, for club teams from Beer Sheva and Holon.

Maccabiah Games
In the 1989 Maccabiah Games, at the age of 19, Kaplan won a gold medal for Israel in the individual all-around competition.

European Championships
In 1990, Kaplan finished in 33rd place in the individual all-around at the European Men's Artistic Gymnastics Championships (the highest finish in Israel's history), and in 1992 he finished in 27th place.

World Championships
Kaplan competed at the World Artistic Gymnastics Championships in 1989, placing 82nd in the individual all-around. In 1991 he placed 64th in the individual all-around, in 1993 he placed 67th in the individual all-around, and in 1994 he came in 54th in the individual all-around.

Olympics
Kaplan represented Israel at the 1992 Summer Olympics in Barcelona, Spain, in gymnastics at the age of 22.  In the Men's Individual All-Around, he came in 65th, out of 93 gymnasts, with a score of 122.250. His best events were the Men's Floor Exercise, in which he came in tied for 36th, and the Men's Rings, in which he came in tied for 47th.

TV commentator
After Kaplan retired from gymnastic competition, he became a TV commentator in Israel.

References

External links
 

1970 births
Living people
Jewish Israeli sportspeople
Olympic gymnasts of Israel
Maccabiah Games gold medalists for Israel
UCLA Bruins men's gymnasts
Sportspeople from Beersheba
Israeli male artistic gymnasts
Gymnasts at the 1992 Summer Olympics
Maccabiah Games medalists in gymnastics
Competitors at the 1989 Maccabiah Games
European Games competitors for Israel
Israeli television people
20th-century Israeli people